Čeněk Zíbrt (1864–1932) was a Czech ethnographer and historian, specializing in folk culture.

Publications
"Jak se kdy v Čechách tancovalo: dějiny tance v Čechách, na Moravě, ve Slezsku a na Slovensku z věkǔ nejstarších až do nové doby se zvláštním Zřetelem k dějinám tance vǔbec (Google eBook)

External links

Extensive biography

20th-century Czech historians
Czech ethnographers
1864 births
1932 deaths
19th-century Czech historians